Amit Behl is an Indian theatre, television and film actor. Behl began his career in 1994 with a role in India's first daily soap opera Shanti.  He later went on to do almost 100 TV serials in Hindi, English, Marathi, Punjabi and Urdu. He has degrees in engineering and management. He currently has roles in Zee Marathi serial Swarajyarakshak Sambhaji and Zee TV serial Buddha and the Life OK series Savitri - EK Prem Kahani . He was seen in Channel V's thriller Friends Conditions Apply. Amit Behl has also worked in serials like Chakravartin Ashoka Samrat and Pradhanmantri. he was seen in Balaji Telefilms fiction daily soap opera Kasam Tere Pyaar Ki on Colors TV.and Also played thé rôle of Ranjeetpratap Singh in Colors TV show ""Ishq Mein Marjawan""

Early life and career
Behl started acting in college theatre.  This was followed by a brief stint in professional theatre in Mumbai and Delhi, after which he joined Shri Ebrahim Alkazi's Living Theatre Academy of Drama.  While at the Academy, Behl studied acting. Over the last 23 years, Behl has worked in performing arts, radio, theatre, television and film.

Amit Behl has featured in TV shows that have been broadcast on a variety of channels, including Doordarshan, Sony Entertainment Television, Zee TV, Zee Marathi EL TV, NEPC TV, DDMetro, Star plus, Star one, Life Ok, Colors, Real channel, Hungamma TV, UTV Bindass, Channel V India, MTV, Viacom 18, Business India TV, Geo Pakistan, ARY Digital, Zee next, UTN, ETV Hindi and Urdu, 9x, channel 9 Gold, Mahuaa, PTC, Lashkaara, Gurjari, Life OK, BBC, and ITV worldwide.

Behl has acted in over 30 feature films in Hindi and English.  He also has anchored over 100 corporate films and documentaries, acted in advertising films, and served as a voice actor in advertisements and foreign language dubbing.

He has been the senior joint secretary of CINTAA (Cine & TV artistes association) since 2015. He is a member of the governing council of MESC (Media & Entertainment skill council), advising NSDC to integrate and recognise skills in the media and entertainment industry. He is a visiting faculty at various media and management schools, including We School Mumbai.

Filmography

Films

Television

References

Male actors in Hindi cinema
Indian male television actors
Living people
1945 births